The 2015–16 season of the 1. Liga Promotion, the third tier of the Swiss football league system, was the fourth season of the league.

The season started on 5 August 2015 and finished on 28 May 2016. The league was won by Servette FC	who made an immediate return to the Challenge League while FC St. Gallen II and Étoile Carouge were relegated to the 1. Liga Promotion.

Table
The 2015–16 season saw three new clubs in the league, SC Cham and SC Kriens, both promoted from the 1. Liga Classic, while Servette FC had been relegated from the Challenge League.

Top goalscorers
The top goal scorers for the season:

Promotion round
The best eight teams of the three divisions of the 1. Liga Classic competed for three spots in the 2016–17 1. Liga Promotion:
Semi-finals

|}
Finals

|}
Decider for third promotion spot

|}
  First number, the Roman numeral, indicates division, second number indicates final position in division.

References

External links 
  

Swiss Liga Promotion
3